The Ying River is the largest tributary of the Huai River with its origin in Henan Province, People's Republic of China. From Zhoukou City in Henan the river flows through Fuyang City in Anhui Province then empties into the Huai River at Zhengyang.

Seriously polluted along its entire length, in 2007 the Ying River's water quality was rated as below Grade 5 by the Chinese Environmental Protection Agency.

Tributaries
The Sha River (沙河) is the largest tributary and from the confluence onward, the Ying River is often referred to as the Shaying River (沙颍河).

See also
List of rivers in China

References

Rivers of Henan
Rivers of Anhui
Tributaries of the Huai River